Davis Coast is that portion of the west coast of the Antarctic Peninsula between Cape Kjellman and Cape Sterneck. It was named by the Advisory Committee on Antarctic Names for Captain John Davis, the American sealer who claimed to have made the first recorded landing on the continent of Antarctica at Hughes Bay on this coast in the Cecilia, February 7, 1821.

Further reading 
 Ute Christina Herzfeld, Atlas of Antarctica: Topographic Maps from Geostatistical Analysis of Satellite Radar Altimeter Data, P 115

References
 

 
Coasts of Graham Land